Röblingen am See station is a railway station in the municipality of Röblingen am See, located in the Mansfeld-Südharz district in Saxony-Anhalt, Germany.

References

Railway stations in Saxony-Anhalt
Buildings and structures in Mansfeld-Südharz